Depressaria kasyi is a moth in the family Depressariidae. It was described by Hans-Joachim Hannemann in 1976. It is found in Afghanistan.

References

Moths described in 1976
Depressaria
Moths of Asia